Cukier is a Polish surname. Notable people with the surname include:

 Aniela Cukier (1900–1944), Polish painter
 Józef Cukier (18891960), Polish leader of the Goralenvolk during World War II
 Wolf Cukier, American high school student and NASA intern who discovered a new planet (now known as TOI 1338 b) in July 2019 at the age of 17

Cukier also means "sugar" in Polish.

Polish-language surnames
Jewish surnames